Elachista latipenella is a moth of the family Elachistidae that is endemic to Ukraine.

References

latipenella
Moths described in 1991
Endemic fauna of Ukraine
Moths of Europe